The Bozieni is a left tributary of the river Bârlad in Romania. It flows into the Bârlad in Cuci.

References

Rivers of Romania
Rivers of Neamț County